m-Toluic acid, (IUPAC: 3-methylbenzoic acid), is an aromatic carboxylic acid, with formula (CH3)C6H4(COOH). It is an isomer of p-toluic acid and o-toluic acid.

Preparation 
m-toluic acid is often prepared in the laboratory by refluxing m-xylene with either nitric acid or potassium permanganate, oxidizing one of the methyl groups to COOH.

Uses 
It serves, among other purposes, as a precursor to DEET (N,N-diethyl-m-toluamide), the well-known insect repellent:

References 

Benzoic acids